Weiyuan County is a county in Gansu province of the People's Republic of China. It is under the administration of the prefecture-level city of Dingxi. Its postal code is 748200, and its population in 2018 was 345,000 people.

Potatoes and traditional Chinese medicinal herbs such as Codonopsis, Angelica, Rhododendron and Astragalus form an important part of agricultural output. Furthermore, 485 kinds of wild Chinese herbal medicines are harvested.

Weiyuan has a long history with 49 ancient cultural sites in the county, including neolithic sites, a Ming Dynasty wooden bridge, and a section of the Qin dynasty Great Wall.

Administrative divisions
Weiyuan County is divided to 12 towns and 4 townships.
Towns

Townships

Climate

See also
 List of administrative divisions of Gansu

References

  Official website (Chinese)

Weiyuan County
Dingxi